Diu Airport  is a civilian aerodrome located at Diu in the Union Territory of Dadra and Nagar Haveli and Daman and Diu, India. Besides Diu, it also serves the neighbouring areas of Gujarat, including Veraval and Jafrabad. It is only airport in the union territory with commercial operations.

History
Diu Airport was built in 1954, when Diu was part of Portuguese India.
Transportes Aéreos da Índia Portuguesa (TAIP) commenced operations to Diu on 16 August 1955. The airline linked Diu with Goa, Daman and Karachi until December 1961, when the Indian air force bombed the airfield.

Structure
Diu Airport's main runway 05/23 is 5922 ft (1826m) long and 45m wide, connected to an apron measuring 60 by 90 metres via two taxiways. The airport terminal can accommodate 100 passengers each in the arrivals and departure halls. A non-directional beacon (NDB) is Diu's sole navigational aid.

Airlines and destinations

References

External links
Diu Airport at AAI

Diu, India
Airports in Dadra and Nagar Haveli and Daman and Diu